The Grand Forks Riverside Neighborhood Historic District is a  historic district in Grand Forks, North Dakota that was listed on the National Register of Historic Places in 2007.

According to The Herald, citing Peg O'Leary, coordinator of the Grand Forks Historic Preservation Commission:

It is the third historic district designated in Grand Forks (the others are the Downtown Grand Forks Historic District and the Grand Forks Near Southside Historic District).The district includes Late 19th and 20th Century Revivals and Late 19th and Early 20th Century American Movements architecture.

When listed, the district included 116 contributing buildings, two contributing structures,  and one contributing site.
Also included are 54 non-contributing buildings.

References

Geography of Grand Forks County, North Dakota
Historic districts on the National Register of Historic Places in North Dakota
National Register of Historic Places in Grand Forks, North Dakota
Neighborhoods in North Dakota